In mathematics, a Schwartz–Bruhat function, named after Laurent Schwartz and François Bruhat, is a complex valued function on a locally compact abelian group, such as the adeles, that generalizes a Schwartz function on a real vector space. A tempered distribution is defined as a continuous linear functional on the space of Schwartz–Bruhat functions.

Definitions
On a real vector space , the Schwartz–Bruhat functions are just the usual Schwartz functions (all derivatives rapidly decreasing) and form the space .
On a torus, the Schwartz–Bruhat functions are the smooth functions.
On a sum of copies of the integers, the Schwartz–Bruhat functions are the rapidly decreasing functions.
On an elementary group (i.e., an abelian locally compact group that is a product of copies of the reals, the integers, the circle group, and finite groups), the Schwartz–Bruhat functions are the smooth functions all of whose derivatives are rapidly decreasing.
On a general locally compact abelian group , let  be a compactly generated subgroup, and  a compact subgroup of  such that  is elementary.
On a non-archimedean local field , a Schwartz–Bruhat function is a locally constant function of compact support. 
For each  we can write , which is finite and thus is well defined.

Examples
This can be seen by observing that  being a local field implies that  by definition has compact support, i.e.,  has a finite subcover.

 . (As for  evaluated at zero,  is always included as a term.)

Properties
The Fourier transform of a Schwartz–Bruhat function on a locally compact abelian group is a Schwartz–Bruhat function on the Pontryagin dual group. Consequently, the Fourier transform takes tempered distributions on such a group to tempered distributions on the dual group. Given the (additive) Haar measure on  the Schwartz–Bruhat space  is dense in the space

Applications
In algebraic number theory, the Schwartz–Bruhat functions on the adeles can be used to give an adelic version of the Poisson summation formula from analysis, i.e., for every  one has , where . John Tate developed this formula in his doctoral thesis to prove a more general version of the functional equation for the Riemann zeta function. This allows one to apply analytic methods to study zeta functions through these zeta integrals.

References

Number theory
Topological groups